Heavy Rocks, also known as Heavy Rocks 2 or Heavy Rocks 2011, is the sixteenth studio album by the Japanese experimental band Boris. The album was released on May 24, 2011, through the label Sargent House. It is the second of three Boris albums of this title, with the others being released in 2002 and 2022; all feature the band exploring hard rock and heavy metal sounds. The band repeated the album title for this release because they "seek to redefine 'heavy' music in a culmination of the band's tireless efforts over the past two decades".

The album was released on the same day as Attention Please, with which it shares the track "Aileron." It also shares different mixes of the songs "Jackson Head" and "Tu, La La" with New Album.

Background
Initial track list information had the song "8" (previously available on Japanese Heavy Rock Hits) listed as the second track, but the final release replaced it with "Leak -Truth, yesnoyesnoyes." On March 29, 2011, Pitchfork Media released the song "Riot Sugar" in promotion for the album.

The vinyl edition features extended versions of "Missing Pieces" and "Czechoslovakia." An additional full length mix of "Czechoslovakia" with vocals by Tomáš Zakopal was released on a split 7-inch with his band, Saade. On May 16, Heavy Rocks in its entirety was made available in full for streaming on NPR Music.

Track listing
All songs and words by Boris with the exception of Track 2 by Boris and Keisuke Suzuki.

Credits

 Takeshi – vocals, bass, and guitar
 Wata – guitar, echo, and keyboard
 Atsuo – vocals, drums, and percussion
 Michio Kurihara – guitar on tracks 2, 5, and 7
 Ian Astbury – vocals on track 1
 Kensuke Saito – analog synth on track 3
 Yoshiko Kawakita – vocals on track 7
 Faith Coloccia – piano on track 9
 Aaron Turner – voices, guitars, and loops on track 9
 Design by Fangsanalsatan and SOMA
 Recording by fangsanalsatan at Sound Square 2009–2011
 Mix and Mastering by Soichiro Nakamura at Peace Music 2011
 Translation by Yoshiko Ikeda
 Production by Boris
 Photos by Miki Matsushima
 Logotype by Futuyong

References

2011 albums
Boris (band) albums